The Capriccio for Violin and Orchestra is a composition by Polish composer Krzysztof Penderecki. It is one of the five caprices that he composed and one of the two that he composed for a soloist with an orchestra, together with the Capriccio for Oboe and Eleven Instruments.

Composition 

This composition was finished in 1967 and was intended for performance in Donaueschingen, on October 22, 1967. On that occasion, Ernest Bour conducted the South West German Radio Orchestra, with Wanda Wilkomirska as the violin soloist. It was eventually dedicated to Heinrich Strobel and published by the Polish Music Publishing House and Moeck Musikinstrumente + Verlag and, later on, by
Schott Music.

Analysis 

This unusual composition takes 10 minutes to perform. It is score for a very large and powerful set of instruments. The list of instruments used in this piece is as follows:

Woodwinds
4 flutes
4 oboes
3 clarinets in B
baritone saxophone
contrabass clarinet in B
3 bassoons
contrabassoon

Brass
6 horns in F
4 trumpets in B
4 trombones
tuba

Percussion
musical saw
vibraphone
bells I
bells II
4 timpani
2 bongos
bass drum
claves
5 wood blocks
ratchet
guiro
whip
4 cowbells
triangle
6 cymbals
2 gongs
gong ageng
2 tam-tams

Other
bass guitar
harp
harmonium
piano

Strings

solo violin

24 violins
10 violas
10 cellos
8 double basses

The composition has no tempo marking at the beginning, even though the last bars are marked as Tempo di Valse. It is mentioned in the score that two or three of the bells from the second bell set should be made of 24-karat gold. Contrary to its concertante nature, the cadenza is fairly close to the beginning.

Notable recordings 
Following are some of the most well-known recordings of this piece:

References

External links 
 Live recording of the piece performed by Wanda Wilkomirska

1967 compositions
Compositions by Krzysztof Penderecki
Compositions for violin and orchestra
Compositions that use extended techniques